Phyllocnistinae is a subfamily of insects in the moth family Gracillariidae.

Genera
Genera:
Phyllocnistis Zeller, 1848

References

 

Moth subfamilies